The Saudi Authority for Industrial Cities and Technology Zones, also known simply as MODON is a government organization  created by the Government of Saudi Arabia in 2001 through Ministerial Legislation No. 235 dated 27/8/1422H.  It is responsible for the regulation and promotion of Industrial Estates and Technology Zones in Saudi Arabia and to encourage the private sector to become involved in the development, operation and maintenance of Industrial Estates.

Director Generals of MODON 
Tawfiq Al Rabiah was Director General of MODON from April 2007 to January 2012.

Eng. Saleh Al-Rasheed was Director General of MODON from December 2011 to April 2017.

Eng. Khaled Al-Salem has been Acting Director General since April 2017. Thereafter he was appointed Director General of MODON by a resolution of its board of directors in September 2017

References

External links 
 

2001 establishments in Saudi Arabia
Government agencies established in 2001
Business organisations based in Saudi Arabia
Government agencies of Saudi Arabia